Wintour is Coming was a headlining concert tour by American rock band Fall Out Boy in support of their 2015 album, American Beauty/American Psycho. It began on February 25, 2016 in San Juan, Puerto Rico, and ended on March 27, 2016 in San Francisco, California. Opening acts included Puerto Rican pop punk band Late Night Drive in San Juan, PVRIS and Awolnation in most of the tour dates and Finish Ticket in San Francisco. The tour, announced in October 2015, played a total of twenty-three concerts over the course one month in the Caribbean and North America, with one of them at Universal Orlando Resort's Mardi Gras 2016. A San Francisco date was announced on January 5, 2016.

Opening acts
Late Night Drive (San Juan)
PVRIS and Awolnation (United States)
Finish Ticket (San Francisco)

Set list
This set list represents the February 25, 2016 date.

"Irresistible"
"Sugar, We're Goin Down"
"The Phoenix"
"Hum Hallelujah"
"Alone Together"
"The Take Over, the Breaks Over"
"The Kids Aren’t Alright"
"This Ain't a Scene, It's an Arms Race"
"Novocaine"
"Disloyal Order of Water Buffaloes"
"Save Rock and Roll"
"Fourth of July"
"Grand Theft Autumn/Where Is Your Boy"
"Uma Thurman"
"Young Volcanoes"
"Dance, Dance"
"American Beauty/American Psycho"
"Immortals"
"I Don’t Care"
"Beat It" 
"Thnks fr th Mmrs"
"Centuries"
Encore
 "My Songs Know What You Did in the Dark (Light Em Up)"
"Saturday"

Tour dates
All dates on U.S. territory, including Puerto Rico

Cancellations

Notes

References

2016 concert tours
Fall Out Boy